Leonel Hernández Valerín (born 3 October 1943 in Cartago) is a retired Costa Rican football player.

Club career
Hernández spent his entire career with hometown club Cartaginés, after joining their youth team in 1957. He made his debut for the senior team in 1962. He was part of the club's famous Ballet Azul squad in the 1970s and became the Costa Rican Primera División top goalscorer in 1973.

In February 2013, Danny Fonseca equalled Hernández' club record of 360 games.

International career
Hernández was capped by Costa Rica, playing 35 games and scoring 11 goals. He represented his country in 10 FIFA World Cup qualification matches.

Personal life
Hernández was born to José Francisco Hernández Madriz and Dolores Valerín Brenes. He is married to María de los Angeles Artavia Luna and they have two daughters. He worked at the audit department at the Banco Crédito Agrícola de Cartago.

References

External links
 Leonel Hernández Valerín - Nación 

1943 births
Living people
People from Cartago Province
Association football forwards
Costa Rican footballers
Costa Rica international footballers
C.S. Cartaginés players